Gaofen 1 is a Chinese high-resolution Earth observation satellite, and the first of the Gaofen series satellites.

History 
The civilian CHEOS (China High-resolution Earth Observation System) satellite program was proposed in 2006 and received approval in 2010. Gaofen 1 was the first of six planned CHEOS spacecraft for being launched between 2013 and 2016. The satellite's primary goal is to provide near real time observations for disaster prevention and relief, climate change monitoring, geographical mapping, environmental and resource surveying as well as precision agriculture support.

Subsequently, over twelve satellites were launched in the Gaofen series, with varying optical, infrared and radar imaging capabilities. They are managed by civilians.

Launch 
Gaofen 1 was launched on 26 April 2013 at 04:13 UTC with a Long March 2D carrier rocket from the Jiuquan Satellite Launch Center along with the three small experimental satellites: TurkSat-3USat (Turkey), CubeBug 1 (Argentina) and NEE-01 Pegaso (Ecuador) in a sun-synchronous orbit.

See also 

 Chinese space program

References 

Spacecraft launched in 2013
Earth observation satellites of China
2013 in China
Spacecraft launched by Long March rockets